Maung Yint Mar (Kyaunggon) is a Burmese author.

In 1991 he won 2nd prize in the Short Stories category of the 1990 Sarpay Beikman manuscript awards for his . 
In May 2007 he won an essay award at the Second Shwe Amuté Literary Awards ceremony, which was held at the Park Royal Hotel in Yangon.
His book  (You Were My First Star Flower When I Was Young & Other Fictional Essays) won a Dr Tin Shwe Literary Award for 2008.

References

Burmese writers
Burmese essayists
Living people
Year of birth missing (living people)